Compton Wynyates or Compton Wyniates is an ancient parish and civil parish in Stratford-on-Avon District, Warwickshire, England. Compton Wynyates was also a village, the earthworks of the village partly survive. It does not have a parish council but has a parish meeting. Population figures for the 2011 census are not available for this parish. Population figures from 1801 to 1961 ranged between 15 and 48, with a figure of 23 in 1961. The civil parish was within Brailes Rural District from 1894 to 1931 and within Shipston-on-Stour Rural District from 1931 to 1974.

History 
The name "Compton" means Valley farm/settlement', the "Wyniates" part means 'windy pass'.

References

External links

Civil parishes in Warwickshire
Stratford-on-Avon District